Ancient Society is an 1877 book by the American anthropologist  Lewis H. Morgan.  Building on the data about kinship and social organization presented in his 1871 Systems of Consanguinity and Affinity of the Human Family, Morgan develops his theory of the three stages of human progress, i.e., from Savagery through Barbarism to Civilization. Contemporary European social theorists such as Karl Marx and Friedrich Engels were influenced by Morgan's work on social structure and material culture, as shown by Engels' The Origin of the Family, Private Property, and the State (1884).

The concept of progress
The dominant idea of Morgan's thought is that of progress. He conceived it as a career of social states arranged in a scale on which man has worked his way up from the bottom. Progress is historically true of the entire human family, but not uniformly. Different branches of the family have evidenced human advancement to different conditions. He thought the scale had universal application or substantially the same in kind, with deviations from uniformity ... produced by special causes. Morgan hopes therefore to discern the principal stages of human development.

Morgan arrived at the idea of a society's progress in part through analogy to individual development. It is an ascent to human supremacy on the earth. The prime analogate is an individual working his way up in society; that is, Morgan, who was well read in classics, relies on the Roman cursus honorum, rising through the ranks, which became the basis of the English ideas of career and working your way up, to which he blends in the rationalist idea of a scala, or ladder, of life. The idea of growth or development is also borrowed from individuals. He proposed that a society has a life like that of an individual, which develops and grows.

He gives the analogy an anthropological twist and introduces the comparative method coming into vogue in other disciplines.  Lewis names units called ethna, by which he means inventions, discoveries and domestic institutions. The ethna are compared and judged higher or lower on the scale, pair by pair. Morgan's ethna appear to comprise at least some of Edward Burnett Tylor's cultural objects. Morgan mentions Tylor a number of times in the book.

Morgan's standard of higher or lower is not clearly expressed. By higher he appears to mean whatever contributes better to control over the environment, victory over competitors, and spread of population. He does not mention Charles Darwin's theory of evolution, but Darwin referred to Morgan's work in his own.

The lines of progress
The substitutions of ethna better than the previous follow several lines of progress.
{|class="wikitable"
!No.
!Line
!Ethna
|+
|-
|I
|Subsistence
|The arts of subsistence are
Natural Subsistence upon Fruits and Roots,
Fish Subsistence,
Farinaceous Subsistence through Cultivation,
Meat and Milk Subsistence,
Unlimited Subsistence through Field Agriculture
|-
|II
|Government
|
|-
|III
|Language
|The origin of language is:
Gesture Language using natural symbols.
Monosyllabical language, the first phase of articulate language.
Syllabical Language.
|-
|IV
|The Family
|The forms of family are
Consanguine, ... the intermarriage of brothers and sisters.
Punaluan, a Hawaiian custom. ... the intermarriage of several brothers to each other's wives ... and of several sisters to each other's husbands... where "brother" meant all the males in one generation of an extended family and "sister" meant all the females, etc.Syndyasmian. Monogamous marriage without exclusive cohabitation.Patriarchal.... the marriage of one man to several wives.Monogamian.... the marriage of one man with one woman, with an exclusive cohabitation.|-
|V
|Religion|
|-
|VI
|House Life and Architecture|
|-
|VII
|Property|
|}

The ethnical periods
Morgan rejects the Ages of Stone, of Bronze, of Iron, the Three-Age System of pre-history, as being insufficient characterizations of progress.  This theory had been explicated by J. J. A. Worsaae in his The Primeval Antiquities of Denmark, published in English in 1849. Worsaae had built his work on the foundation of evidence-based chronology by Christian Jürgensen Thomsen, whose Guideline to Scandinavian Antiquity (Ledetraad til Nordisk Oldkyndighed) (1836), was not published in English until 1848.  The two works were highly influential to researchers in Great Britain and North America.

Morgan believed the prehistoric stages as defined by the Danish were difficult to distinguish, as they overlapped and refer only to material types of implements or tools. In addition, Morgan thought they did not fit the evidence he was finding among Native American societies in North America, in which he had closely studied social structure as an indicator of stages of civilization. Based on the lines of progress, he distinguishes ethnical periods, which each have a distinct culture and a particular mode of life'' and do not overlap in a region. He does admit to exceptions and a difficulty of determining precise borders between periods. Scientific archaeology was being developed at this time; Morgan did not have the techniques of stratigraphy or scientific dating available, but based his arguments on linguistic and historical speculation. (Thomsen and Worsaae are credited with the foundation of scientific archaeology, as they worked to have controlled excavations in which artifacts could be evaluated by which were found together: the beginning of stratigraphy. This evidence-based system was the start of chronological dating in archeology.)

Notes

Sources

External links
 Full text of Ancient Society

1877 non-fiction books
American non-fiction books
Anthropology books
Books about civilizations
English-language books